The plain-tailed warbling finch (Microspingus alticola) is a species of bird in the family Thraupidae.
It is endemic to Peru.

Its natural habitat is subtropical or tropical moist montane forests.
It is threatened by habitat loss.

References

plain-tailed warbling finch
Birds of the Peruvian Andes
Endemic birds of Peru
plain-tailed warbling finch
plain-tailed warbling finch
Taxonomy articles created by Polbot